Sefid Ab (also Romanized as Sefīd Āb) is a village in Makvan Rural District, Bayangan District, Paveh County, Kermanshah Province, Iran. At the 2006 census, its population was 54, in 15 families.

References 

Populated places in Paveh County